BC ICIM Arad is a professional women's basketball team from Arad, Romania. The club, for sponsorship reason under the name BC Univ. Goldiș ICIM Arad, competes in the Liga Națională.

The club is one of the most successful basketball clubs in Romanian women's basketball with 9 National Leagues and 2 Romanian Cups.

Honours
 Liga Națională
Winners (9): 1993–94, 1997–98, 1998–99, 1999–00, 2000–01, 2005–06, 2007–08, 2010–11, 2012–13
Runners-up (3): 2006–07, 2009–10, 2013–14
 Cupa României
Winners (2): 2010–11, 2013–14
Runners-up (2): 2006–07, 2019-2020
 Liga I
Winners (1): 1986–87

 Central Europe Women's League
Winners (3): 2010–11, 2012–13 2014–15
Runners-up (2): 2011–12, 2013–14

Current roster

References

External links
 Eurobasket 
 frbaschet.ro 

Arad, Romania
Basketball teams in Romania
Women's basketball teams in Romania
Basketball teams established in 1986
1986 establishments in Romania